Picket 43 is a 2015 Malayalam-language Indian drama film written and directed by Major Ravi. It stars Prithviraj and Javed Jaffrey in the lead roles. It was filmed by cinematographer Jomon T. John and most portions of the film were shot in Kashmir. The film dealt with the story of an Indian army soldier guarding a picket alone in Kashmir, and his friendship with a Pakistani soldier.

The film released on 23 January 2015 to highly positive reviews from critics and audience alike. The film is one of the profitable Malayalam films of 2015 considering theatrical collections, and satellite and television rights.

Plot
Hareendranath Nair (Prithviraj) is an Indian soldier who is assigned to guard an Indian Picket  ( i.e., Picket 43) in Kashmir. It was said to be a very dangerous place, and Hareendran had to be forced to take charge at the place, forsaking his sanctioned leave due to the forcefulness of his superior officer (Renji Panicker). Hareendran is forced to stay at the Picket with an extremely trained dog called Baccardi as his companion. He starts seeing the dog akin to someone with intelligence and treats him like a person, not even permitting anyone to call Baccardi a 'dog'.  Hareendran confides in the dog his inner thoughts and emotions, which lifts his spirit slightly even at the most difficult times.

It is slowly revealed that the reason Hareendran had applied for the above-mentioned leave was to register marry the girl he loved, who happened to be his uncle's daughter. When Hareendran, along with his mother, proposed a marriage between him and his cousin to his uncle, he was forsaken by his uncle in favor of a guy from the very same village who had made a fortune in Dubai. Hareendran along with his friends concluded that the only way to marry his lover was a register marriage, and decides to do it the next time he comes to the village on leave. It was before the decided dated that his already sanctioned leave was canceled, telling us the reason to why he was so sad.

For the first eight months of his stay at the picket, the Pakistani picket opposite his picket, across the L.O.C, was occupied by a very hostile Pakistani.

It was then that a very peculiar Pakistani soldier named  Mushraff (Javed Jaffrey) is introduced. Mushraff had come to replace the Pakistani who was hostile to Hareendran at the picket. They slowly relate to each other and despite hailing from different countries, they began to understand each other better than anyone else. They eventually become close friends and started to enhance the morale of each other.

One day the border was attacked and Ranger Musharaff was fatally shot down by terrorists while he was providing support to Hareendaran. Hareendaran then tries to protect the border on his own and eventually succeeds.

As backup arrives Hareendaran requests the commander to inform the Pakistani embassy that Musharaff is shot and that medics need to arrive immediately. He even added that he would cross the L.O.C if medics don't arrive as soon as possible. Some time later medics arrive and it is revealed that Musharaff is still alive.

In the end, the viewer finds himself appreciating and realizing  the sacrifices made by the army to protect our life.

Cast
 Prithviraj as Havildar Harindran 'Hari' Nair
 Javed Jaffrey as Mushraff Khan, Pakistani soldier
 Renji Panicker as C.O Vinay Chandran
 Sudheer Karamana as Rajan Pattambi
 Kannan Nair
 Meghanathan as Subedar Major Thampi
 Haresh Peradi as Lakshmi's father
 Angana Roy as Hanara
 Anu Mohan as Soldier Dineshan
 Anshu Sharma as Lakshmi
 Shobha Mohan as Hari's mother
 Madan Mohan
 Mohanlal as Himself (cameo)
 Allan Varghese Chandy
 Shaikh Mohd Afzal
 Wasim Subhedar
Sagar Singh

Theme
Instead of focusing on devastating wars and the like, the movie deals more with the psychological trauma a soldier has to go through in order to safeguard his motherland. It also throws light on the fact that friendship is not based on certain rules or conventions and that the key factor for a true friendship is to have a better understanding and compassion for each other. It also explains how a faithful dog can turn out to be your confidante when you feel alone and dejected.

Casting
Initially Ravi developed the film with for Mohanlal in the lead role as a reboot to the Major Mahadevan film series. But when approached, he was reluctant to take the role, because, he felt that the character did not match with his age, and said it would be more suitable for a younger actor. He also doubted how people would accept a 'Havildar Mahadevan' since the fictional character was normally portrayed in higher rank in the earlier films. And when asked he suggested Prithviraj.

Theatrical run
The film ran for 50 days in selected releasing centres. Still it is considered as one of the "profited" Malayalam film in 2015, considering theatrical collection and satellite rights.

Controversy
Producer Sunil O. G lodged a complaint against Major Ravi to the Kerala Film Producers Association, citing that the movie caused financial loss due to the excessive budget. According to him, the film was planned with a budget of 4 crores; but was later exceeded by about 70 lakhs rupees. "There was a legal agreement stating that the film should be completed within a stipulated budget, but Ravi couldn't manage the expenses".

References

External links
 
 Official Facebook Page

2015 films
2010s Malayalam-language films
Films scored by Rex Vijayan
Indian Army in films
Films about friendship
Indian buddy drama films
Indian drama films
Films directed by Major Ravi
India–Pakistan relations in popular culture
2015 drama films